HCP 115N (type assigned by Research and Development Center for Rail Vehicles: 115N, type introduced by the manufacturer and used by the operator: 105N/2, nicknamed  ("earthworm")) – the first Polish prototype partially low-floor tram that was produced by H. Cegielski factory in Poznań. It was made in 1995 from two Konstal 105N cars used by MPK Poznań and in service until 2006. In 2011 the tram has been scrapped.

History

Genesis 
In the 1990s the decision was made that tracks of the Poznań Fast Tram, that was under construction at the time, will be connected with tram network which caused to buy a high capacity trams. Despite the successful tests of composition made of four coupled Konstal 105Na tramcars, the operator wanted to buy low-floor trams. As the offer of European manufacturers of this type of trams was beyond the financial possibilities of the city, and there was no vehicle meeting the requirements of MPK on the domestic market, it was decided to build a new type of tram.

Production and premiere 
In 1994 the H. Cegielski factory bought from MPK two 105N tramcars of fleet numbers 163 and 164. In the same year, with the intention about subsequent units of the new vehicle, MPK bought additional five cars from Tram Communication Enterprise in Katowice. In mid-1995, the construction of a tram with new traction characteristics was completed, using vehicles purchased by HCP.

In June 1995 the new tram 115N has been presented at the Poznań International Fair. Because of the finishing works at the electric system, the tram could not make the demonstration drive.

The fall of the project 
In 1996 HCP proposed the 115N trams on the tender for low-floor trams for Poznań, but the offer was declined as not meeting the requirements, because MPK wanted to buy factory new trams. In addition, because of the high unreliability of the prototype, it was not decided to mass-produce the tram. Due to decision of not making the serial production the tramcars bought from PKT Katowice that were supposed to be modified were dismantled to pieces with exception of one that got earlier put into service in MPK.

Construction

Body 

The 115N type tram had three sections. The first and the last one were made from the reconstruction of 105N tramcars bought by the manufacturer and adapting them to connect with a newly made low-floor section by a pivot joint covered by a black concertina.

The middle section had two pairs of double doors. All of the doors were made from plastic and had individual opening buttons.

Interior 

The tram had thirty-four soft upholstered and vandalism-proof seats. The frontier sections had fifteen of them, and the new middle section had four. The tram also had tilting windows.

The equipment and interior layout of the middle section were adapted to the transport of disabled people in wheelchairs and prams. There were three designated places for them that had inertial belts.

The passenger information system consisted of a broadcasting device that was placed on the dashboard and used by motorman and speakers placed on the ceiling. The information could be played from a tape or through a microphone. In addition, the tram's front had a scrollable directional board.

Bogies 
All of the four bogie of the tram were 2NN bogies modernized by HCP. They were equipped with the second degree of springing.

Drive system 
 was powered by direct current taken from an overhead contact line by an automatically lowered OTK1-type pantograph placed on the roof. The drive was provided by 8 DC motors with a power of 41.5 kW each. The starting system was from Konstal 105Na.

Service 

On July 12, 1995  was delivered to MPK Poznań. The tram got a fleet number 400 and was assigned to  tram depot. The vehicle also got a new yellow-light green colour scheme of the operator.

In mid-September 1995 the tram began its service on route 6. As the 105N tramcars No. 163 and No. 164 that were used to make a new tram deleted from the inventory on September 1, 1995, and the new 115N tram was bought from the manufacturer only on December 16, 1996, the courses of a new vehicle were recorded as the ones of 105N tramcars No. 163+164 composition. Until the opening of Poznań Fast Tram in 1997 the 115N was running rarely on another tram lines. After the event the situation had changed and the tram could be met on line 14 and another that were handled by  depot.

During the service, the upholstered seats were replaced with the same ones as used in 105N trams in MPK and the frontal directional board was replaced with a coffer for plastic boards.

Because of the frequent malfunctions, mostly of the doors, voltage converters and cables rubbing inside pivotal joints, the tram was put out of service sometimes even for a few months. The vehicle was not in service from July to September in 1998, in September 2000, at summer of 2001, from June to August in 2002 and in January 2003.

In May 2003 the tram No. 400 was used in  advertising campaign so it was assigned to line 5 and was painted in white-blue-violet color scheme. After the campaign has been finished, the vehicle recovered its original color scheme with exception of grille that retained white color and had a blue sign that informed of adaption for disabled passengers.

In 2006, again due to cables rubbing inside pivotal joints, the vehicle went to depot and was later placed on side tracks near Budziszyńska Street. Despite a rationalizing project that was to eliminate tram's faults the tram was never running again. In early 2008 the tram was transported to Modertrans facility, from where afterwards returned to the side tracks. On April 14, 2010, the 115N was deleted from MPK's inventory and in August 2011 was sold to Modertrans. There were attempts to preserve the tram as an exhibit but on August 24, 2011, it left the side tracks. On the next day  has been dismantled and the remains were transported to a scrapyard in Śrem.

See also

References

External links 

 Description and panorama of 115N on MPK Poznań website (in Polish; viewing the panorama requires unsupported Adobe Flash plugin)
 Photos of 115N on Phototrans.eu

Tram vehicles of Poland
Transport in Poznań